Sparx is an American New Mexico music band. The band is composed of the four Sanchez sisters Verónica, Rosamaria, Kristyna and Carolina. They were known beginning with their childhood career, in the 1980s. In the 1990s they found fame in Mexico and most Latin American countries in addition to success in the United States, recording a variety of styles of songs including pop songs, as well as Latin music classics, corridos, cumbias, ballads, and boleros.

They had their beginning taking part in a songwriting competition at the festival Juguemos a Cantar with the winning song "Vamos a Jugar". They appeared as "Lorenzo Antonio y Su Grupo" (Lorenzo Antonio and His Group). They've collaborated with their brother Lorenzo often, including with albums like Corridos Famosos, Latin folk songs like a take on Juan Gabriel's and Rocío Dúrcal's "Que Bonito es Santa Fé" and even country duets like "The Wild Side of Life/It Wasn't God Who Made Honky Tonk Angels".

The sisters came from a musical family. Their father Amador Sanchez was a musician, songwriter, and record producer known as Tiny Morrie who had a huge hit "Cartas Tristes". Their mother, Gloria Pohl, was a vocalist who has recorded two albums. Their brother Lorenzo Antonio is also a renowned singing artist in his own right. Their uncles Al Hurricane dubbed Godfather of New Mexico music and Baby Gaby, as well as Al's son Al Hurricane, Jr.

Many of their songs have hit the top 10 on Billboards Latin charts. The band has also been nominated for Billboard awards and the Lo Nuestro Award for Pop Group or Duo of the Year at the 7th Lo Nuestro Awards.

Sparx members and their brother Lorenzo Antonio are very much involved in charity through Sparx Lorenzo Antonio Foundation. Since 2001, date of its establishment, the foundation distributes college scholarships for New Mexico high school students.

Discography
1991: “Lágrimas de Juventud"
1993: “Un Tonto Mas"
1994: Con Mariarchi
1994: Te Amo, Te Amo, Te Amo
1995: Hay un Tonto Más
1995: Mándame Flores
1996: Cantan Corridos
1997: Tiene Que Ser Amor
1999: Navidad
1999: Cantan Corridos, Vol. 2
2000: No Hay Otro Amor
2001: 15 Kilates Musicales
2001: Con Mariachi, Vol. 2
2001: Para las Madrecitas
2003: Lo Dice Mi Corazón
2004: Caminos del Amor
2005: Con Mucho Amor
2015: Juntas Otra Ve z

Joint albums (Lorenzo Antonio and Sparx)
1996: Sparx y Lorenzo Antonio Cantan Corridos
1998: Sparx y Lorenzo Antonio Cantan Corridos Vol. 2
2007: Lorenzo Antonio y Sparx Corridos Famosos Con Mariarchi
Lorenzo Antonio y Sparx Grandes Exitos Con Mariachi 
Para Las Madrecitas
¡Fiesta!
¡A Bailar!

Singles

References

External links
Sparx Official website

Family musical groups
Fonovisa Records artists
Musical groups from New Mexico
New Mexico music artists
Latin pop music groups